Borodino is the name of several inhabited localities in Russia.

Modern localities

Bryansk Oblast
As of 2012, one rural locality in Bryansk Oblast bears this name:
Borodino, Bryansk Oblast, a village in Lopushsky Rural Administrative Okrug of Vygonichsky District;

Ivanovo Oblast
As of 2012, three rural localities in Ivanovo Oblast bear this name:
Borodino, Gavrilovo-Posadsky District, Ivanovo Oblast, a selo in Gavrilovo-Posadsky District
Borodino, Kineshemsky District, Ivanovo Oblast, a village in Kineshemsky District
Borodino, Palekhsky District, Ivanovo Oblast, a village in Palekhsky District

Kaliningrad Oblast
As of 2012, one rural locality in Kaliningrad Oblast bears this name:
Borodino, Kaliningrad Oblast, a settlement in Mozyrsky Rural Okrug of Pravdinsky District

Kaluga Oblast
As of 2012, one rural locality in Kaluga Oblast bears this name:
Borodino, Kaluga Oblast, a village in Medynsky District

Kemerovo Oblast
As of 2012, one rural locality in Kemerovo Oblast bears this name:
Borodino, Kemerovo Oblast, a settlement under the administrative jurisdiction of Myski Town Under Oblast Jurisdiction;

Republic of Khakassia
As of 2012, one rural locality in the Republic of Khakassia bears this name:
Borodino, Republic of Khakassia, a selo in Borodinsky Selsoviet of Bogradsky District

Kostroma Oblast
As of 2012, three rural localities in Kostroma Oblast bear this name:
Borodino, Dmitriyevskoye Settlement, Galichsky District, Kostroma Oblast, a village in Dmitriyevskoye Settlement of Galichsky District; 
Borodino, Orekhovskoye Settlement, Galichsky District, Kostroma Oblast, a village in Orekhovskoye Settlement of Galichsky District; 
Borodino, Sharyinsky District, Kostroma Oblast, a village in Shangskoye Settlement of Sharyinsky District;

Krasnoyarsk Krai
As of 2012, two inhabited localities in Krasnoyarsk Krai bear this name:

Urban localities
Borodino, Krasnoyarsk Krai, a town; administratively incorporated as a krai city

Rural localities
Borodino, Rybinsky District, Krasnoyarsk Krai, a selo in Borodinsky Selsoviet of Rybinsky District

Kurgan Oblast
As of 2012, one rural locality in Kurgan Oblast bears this name:
Borodino, Kurgan Oblast, a village in Prosekovsky Selsoviet of Vargashinsky District;

Kursk Oblast
As of 2012, one rural locality in Kursk Oblast bears this name:
Borodino, Kursk Oblast, a village in Kolpakovsky Selsoviet of Kurchatovsky District

Moscow Oblast
As of 2012, ten rural localities in Moscow Oblast bear this name:
Borodino (settlement), Mozhaysky District, Moscow Oblast, a settlement in Borodinskoye Rural Settlement of Mozhaysky District; 
Borodino, Sinkovskoye Rural Settlement, Dmitrovsky District, Moscow Oblast, a village in Sinkovskoye Rural Settlement of Dmitrovsky District; 
Borodino, Dmitrov, Dmitrovsky District, Moscow Oblast, a village under the administrative jurisdiction of the Town of Dmitrov in Dmitrovsky District; 
Borodino, Lotoshinsky District, Moscow Oblast, a village in Osheykinskoye Rural Settlement of Lotoshinsky District; 
Borodino (village), Mozhaysky District, Moscow Oblast, a village in Borodinskoye Rural Settlement of Mozhaysky District, and namesake of the Battle of Borodino; 
Borodino, Mytishchinsky District, Moscow Oblast, a village under the administrative jurisdiction of the Town of Mytishchi in Mytishchinsky District; 
Borodino, Podolsky District, Moscow Oblast, a village in Lagovskoye Rural Settlement of Podolsky District; 
Borodino, Shatursky District, Moscow Oblast, a village in Dmitrovskoye Rural Settlement of Shatursky District
Borodino, Solnechnogorsky District, Moscow Oblast, a village in Smirnovskoye Rural Settlement of Solnechnogorsky District
Borodino, Taldomsky District, Moscow Oblast, a village in Yermolinskoye Rural Settlement of Taldomsky District

Novgorod Oblast
As of 2012, one rural locality in Novgorod Oblast bears this name:
Borodino, Novgorod Oblast, a village in Ivanovskoye Settlement of Starorussky District

Oryol Oblast
As of 2012, one rural locality in Oryol Oblast bears this name:
Borodino, Oryol Oblast, a selo in Borodinsky Selsoviet of Dmitrovsky District

Perm Krai
As of 2012, one rural locality in Perm Krai bears this name:
Borodino, Perm Krai, a village in Beryozovsky District

Pskov Oblast
As of 2012, six rural localities in Pskov Oblast bear this name:
Borodino, Loknyansky District, Pskov Oblast, a village in Loknyansky District
Borodino (Goluboozerskaya Rural Settlement), Nevelsky District, Pskov Oblast, a village in Nevelsky District; municipally, a part of Goluboozerskaya Rural Settlement of that district
Borodino (Turichinskaya Rural Settlement), Nevelsky District, Pskov Oblast, a village in Nevelsky District; municipally, a part of Turichinskaya Rural Settlement of that district
Borodino, Novorzhevsky District, Pskov Oblast, a village in Novorzhevsky District
Borodino, Opochetsky District, Pskov Oblast, a village in Opochetsky District
Borodino, Palkinsky District, Pskov Oblast, a village in Palkinsky District

Rostov Oblast
As of 2012, one rural locality in Rostov Oblast bears this name:
Borodino, Rostov Oblast, a khutor in Nizhnekundryuchenskoye Rural Settlement of Ust-Donetsky District

Smolensk Oblast
As of 2012, two rural localities in Smolensk Oblast bear this name:
Borodino, Rudnyansky District, Smolensk Oblast, a village in Lyubavichskoye Rural Settlement of Rudnyansky District
Borodino, Vyazemsky District, Smolensk Oblast, a village in Novoselskoye Rural Settlement of Vyazemsky District

Tula Oblast
As of 2012, one rural locality in Tula Oblast bears this name:
Borodino, Tula Oblast, a village in Podosinovsky Rural Okrug of Kireyevsky District

Tver Oblast
As of 2012, nine rural localities in Tver Oblast bear this name:
Borodino, Kalyazinsky District, Tver Oblast, a village in Semendyayevskoye Rural Settlement of Kalyazinsky District
Borodino, Ilyinskoye Rural Settlement, Kimrsky District, Tver Oblast, a village in Ilyinskoye Rural Settlement of Kimrsky District
Borodino, Neklyudovskoye Rural Settlement, Kimrsky District, Tver Oblast, a village in Neklyudovskoye Rural Settlement of Kimrsky District
Borodino, Kuvshinovsky District, Tver Oblast, a village in Tysyatskoye Rural Settlement of Kuvshinovsky District
Borodino, Ostashkovsky District, Tver Oblast, a village in Moshenskoye Rural Settlement of Ostashkovsky District
Borodino, Penovsky District, Tver Oblast, a village in Okhvatskoye Rural Settlement of Penovsky District
Borodino, Sonkovsky District, Tver Oblast, a village in Pishchalkinskoye Rural Settlement of Sonkovsky District
Borodino, Torzhoksky District, Tver Oblast, a village in Rudnikovskoye Rural Settlement of Torzhoksky District
Borodino, Vesyegonsky District, Tver Oblast, a village in Lyubegoshchinskoye Rural Settlement of Vesyegonsky District

Tyumen Oblast
As of 2012, one rural locality in Tyumen Oblast bears this name:
Borodino, Tyumen Oblast, a selo in Kotochigovsky Rural Okrug of Vikulovsky District

Vladimir Oblast
As of 2012, three rural localities in Vladimir Oblast bear this name:
Borodino, Kameshkovsky District, Vladimir Oblast, a village in Kameshkovsky District
Borodino, Suzdalsky District, Vladimir Oblast, a village in Suzdalsky District
Borodino, Vyaznikovsky District, Vladimir Oblast, a village in Vyaznikovsky District

Volgograd Oblast
As of 2012, one rural locality in Volgograd Oblast bears this name:
Borodino, Volgograd Oblast, a khutor in Rossoshensky Selsoviet of Gorodishchensky District

Vologda Oblast
As of 2012, one rural locality in Vologda Oblast bears this name:
Borodino, Vologda Oblast, a village in Nikiforovsky Selsoviet of Ustyuzhensky District

Yaroslavl Oblast
As of 2012, four rural localities in Yaroslavl Oblast bear this name:
Borodino, Borisoglebsky District, Yaroslavl Oblast, a village in Shchurovsky Rural Okrug of Borisoglebsky District
Borodino, Lyubimsky District, Yaroslavl Oblast, a village in Voskresensky Rural Okrug of Lyubimsky District
Borodino, Rostovsky District, Yaroslavl Oblast, a village in Savinsky Rural Okrug of Rostovsky District
Borodino, Uglichsky District, Yaroslavl Oblast, a village in Klementyevsky Rural Okrug of Uglichsky District

Abolished localities
Borodino, Kardymovsky District, Smolensk Oblast, a village in Berezkinskoye Rural Settlement of Kardymovsky District in Smolensk Oblast; abolished in July 2010

Alternative names
Borodino, alternative name of Borodinka, a village in Saratovsky Selsoviet of Makushinsky District in Kurgan Oblast;